The HiPhi Z is a electric Executive car produced by Human Horizons under the HiPhi brand. The vehicle was first presented as a concept in China in November 2021.

Overview

The HiPhi Z was originally previewed by the HiPhi Z Concept revealed in November 2021. The production HiPhi Z was presented at the 2022 Chengdu Auto Show in August 2022. The HiPhi Z is based on the same platform that underpins the HiPhi X electric luxury crossover.

Interior
The main feature inside the HiPhi Z is the HiPhi Bot, an AI companion in the touchscreen that can automatically adjust following commands. Ambient panel lights and the HiPhi bot can sync with the 23-speaker Meridian audio system while the center tablet is able to automatically turn 90 degrees from vertical to horizontal.
The HiPhi Z features a NVIDIA Orin X chip and QNX Neutrino real-time operating system to control 34 individual sensors in addition to LiDAR that constantly scan the surrounding environment for assisted driving and parking. The 34 sensors include a 128-beam LiDAR from Hesai Technology, 13 cameras, 5 millimeter-wave radars, 12 ultrasonic radars, and 1 three-sectional hands-off detection sensor.

Performance
The HiPhi Z will come with a 120 kWh battery pack promising 705 km (438 miles) of NEDC range.

References

HiPhi vehicles

Production electric cars
Hatchbacks
Cars introduced in 2021
All-wheel-drive vehicles
Electric concept cars
Vehicles with four-wheel steering